The Spy Who Came In from the Cold is a 1965 British spy film based on the 1963 novel of the same name by John le Carré. The film stars Richard Burton, Claire Bloom, and Oskar Werner. It was directed by Martin Ritt, and the screenplay was written by Paul Dehn and Guy Trosper.

The film depicts British MI6 agent Alec Leamas' mission as a faux defector who is given the task of sowing damaging disinformation about a powerful East German intelligence officer. As part of a charade, Leamas is apparently dismissed from the British secret intelligence service and becomes an embittered alcoholic. He is soon approached by East German agents in Britain, and he allows himself to be recruited and taken to continental Europe to sell his secrets for money. Just when it seems that he has successfully discredited his target, however, Leamas is revealed to be an active British intelligence agent disseminating false information. Much to his surprise, this revelation achieves the real and heretofore hidden objectives of the mission.

The Spy Who Came In from the Cold was a box-office success, receiving positive reviews and several awards, including four BAFTA Awards for Best British Film, Best Actor, Best Cinematography, and Best Art Direction. For his performance, Richard Burton received the David di Donatello Award for Best Foreign Actor, the Golden Laurel Award, and an Academy Award nomination for Best Actor in a Leading Role. The film was named one of the top ten films of 1966 by the National Board of Review in the United States.

Plot 
The West Berlin office of MI6, under station chief Alec Leamas, has suffered from reduced effectiveness. He is recalled to London shortly after the death of one of his operatives and is seemingly drummed out of the agency. In reality, a carefully staged transformation of Leamas has been arranged by Control, the agency's chief. Appearing to be depressed, embittered and alcoholic, Leamas takes work as an assistant at a local library. There he begins a relationship with co-worker Nan Perry, a young and idealistic member of the British Communist Party. Leamas spends most of his small salary on alcohol, leaving him constantly low on funds. He drunkenly assaults a shopkeeper who refuses him credit and is briefly jailed. His predicament attracts the attention of the East German Intelligence Service, which sees him as a potential defector.

Leamas is approached by a series of operatives, each one passing him up the chain of the East German intelligence service, and he expresses a willingness to sell British secrets for money. He eventually flies to the Netherlands to meet an agent named Peters, who decides that his information is important enough to send him on to East Germany. At a German country house, Leamas is introduced to Fiedler, who becomes his main interrogator. Leamas then begins to carry out his secret mission, which is to share information that suggests a high-ranking East German intelligence officer named Mundt is a paid informant of the British. The evidence is circumstantial, and though it seems to implicate Mundt, Leamas repeatedly refutes that conclusion, claiming that an important East German official could not have been a British agent without his knowledge. However, Fiedler is able to independently confirm Leamas' information and comes to the conclusion that Mundt, his supervisor, has indeed been a secret asset of British intelligence for many years.

Mundt himself unexpectedly arrives at the compound and has both Leamas and Fiedler arrested for plotting against him. Once Fiedler explains his findings to his superiors, the tables are turned and Mundt is arrested. A secret tribunal is convened to try Mundt for espionage, with Leamas compelled to testify. Fiedler presents a strong case for Mundt being a paid double agent. However, Mundt's attorney uncovers several discrepancies in Leamas' transformation into an informant, suggesting that Leamas is a faux defector. Leamas' credibility collapses when Nan, who has been brought to East Germany for what she thought was a cultural exchange visit, is forced to testify at the tribunal and unwittingly reveals that she has been receiving payments from a British intelligence officer as Leamas had arranged. Faced with this testimony, Leamas reluctantly admits that he is indeed a British agent. Mundt is vindicated, and Fiedler is arrested as a complicit dupe.

Leamas initially believes he has failed in his mission and fears severe retribution from Mundt. However, in the middle of the night, Mundt releases Leamas and Nan from their cells and provides an escape plan for them both. Mundt explains that Leamas' real mission has succeeded; Mundt actually is a British agent, and Fiedler had been the target of the operation all along, as he had grown too suspicious of his supervisor. This comes as a shock to Leamas, and the complex web he has been drawn into and the risk he has been placed in by his own superiors become painfully clear. He explains the entire plot to still-idealistic Nan as they drive their borrowed car toward the border. She berates him for being involved in what amounts to the murder of Fiedler, who was only doing his job. Leamas, agitated by her naiveté, erupts in an angry, self-loathing confession:
What the hell do you think spies are? Moral philosophers measuring everything they do against the word of God or Karl Marx? They're not. They're just a bunch of seedy squalid bastards like me, little men, drunkards, queers, henpecked husbands, civil servants playing "Cowboys and Indians" to brighten their rotten little lives. Do you think they sit like monks in a cell, balancing right against wrong? Yesterday I would have killed Mundt because I thought him evil and an enemy. But not today. Today he is evil and my friend.

Leamas and Nan arrive at the Berlin Wall and are given instructions to climb over to West Germany on an emergency ladder while a searchlight is intentionally turned away. Leamas is at the top of the wall pulling Nan up behind him when the searchlight suddenly shines directly on them, alarms sound, and Nan is shot dead by Mundt's operatives, silencing the only civilian witness to the operation. Leamas freezes in shock and horror, and is urged by agents on both sides to return to the West. Instead, he begins to climb down towards Nan's body on the eastern side of the wall and is also shot and killed.

Cast

Production
The film closely follows the plot of the original source text. One exception is that the name of the principal female character in the novel, Liz Gold, is changed to Nan Perry in the film, reputedly because the producers were worried about the potential confusion in the media with Burton's wife, Elizabeth Taylor.

Ardmore Studios in Ireland and England's Shepperton Studios were used for the shooting of interior scenes.

Reception
The Spy Who Came In from the Cold took in $7,600,000 at the box office.

Bosley Crowther of The New York Times wrote, "After all the spy and mystery movies of a romantic and implausible nature that we have seen, it is great to see one as realistic, and believable too, as The Spy Who Came In from the Cold." Variety called the film "an excellent contemporary espionage drama of the Cold War which achieves solid impact via emphasis on human values, total absence of mechanical spy gimmickry, and perfectly controlled underplaying." Philip K. Scheuer of the Los Angeles Times wrote: "It is not an easy, certainly not a pleasant, picture to sit through; too impersonal, too objective, to move us to weep, so that its ending can only leave us tremendously depressed." Richard L. Coe of The Washington Post declared: "Not having shared the evidently widespread admiration for The Spy Who Came In from the Cold in its original form as a novel, I nonetheless find it a wholly absorbing picture." Brendan Gill of The New Yorker called it "in every respect an admirable translation [to] the screen of the fantastically popular thriller by Jean [sic] le Carré." The Monthly Film Bulletin wrote, "Concentration is demanded; and earned by the tension and accuracy of the dialogue and the high level of performance ... [the cast] all give performances of a kind which instantly engage attention, even if the characters scarcely develop beyond the point at which we first meet them."

The film holds a score of 86% on Rotten Tomatoes based on 14 reviews, with an average grade of 7.7 out of 10.

Awards and nominations

Home media
The Spy Who Came In from the Cold was released by The Criterion Collection as a Region 1 DVD on 25 November 2008 and on Blu-ray on 10 September 2013. Extras for this version include: digitally restored picture and sound; an interview with John le Carré; scene-specific commentary by director of photography Oswald Morris; a BBC documentary titled The Secret Center: John le Carré (2000); an interview with Richard Burton from a 1967 episode of the BBC series Acting in the '60s; a 1985 audio interview with director Martin Ritt; a gallery of set designs; the film's theatrical trailer; and a booklet featuring an essay by film critic Michael Sragow.

References

External links
 
 
 
 
 The Movie Scene review
 The Spy Who Came In from the Cold: True Ritt an essay by Michael Sragow at the Criterion Collection

1965 films
1965 drama films
1960s spy drama films
1960s English-language films
British spy drama films
Cold War spy films
British black-and-white films
Films directed by Martin Ritt
Paramount Pictures films
Edgar Award-winning works
Films based on British novels
Films based on works by John le Carré
Films about the Secret Intelligence Service
Films about the Berlin Wall
Films set in Berlin
Films set in London
Films set in the Netherlands
Films shot in the Republic of Ireland
Films shot in Dublin (city)
Films with screenplays by Paul Dehn
Best British Film BAFTA Award winners
Films featuring a Best Supporting Actor Golden Globe winning performance
Films scored by Sol Kaplan
Films set in West Germany
Films set in East Germany
Films shot at Shepperton Studios
1960s British films